The following list includes notable people who were born or have lived in Bloomfield Hills, Michigan.

Academics and engineering

Business

Media and music

Politics and law

Sports

Baseball

Basketball

Football

Hockey

Tennis

References

Bloomfield Hills
Bloomfield Hills